Polyphylla anteronivea, known generally as the saline valley snow-front scarab or saline valley snow-front June beetle, is a species of scarab beetle in the family Scarabaeidae. It is found in North America.

References

Further reading

 
 

Polyphylla
Articles created by Qbugbot
Beetles described in 1978